The 2014 FKF President's Cup (known as the GOtv Shield for sponsorship reasons) was the 43rd season of Kenya's top domestic cup competition. It began on 26 April and ended on 15 November, with the domestic broadcasting rights for the competition held by SuperSport. Participating teams were required to pay a registration fee of KSh.30,000/= each to enter the tournament. The competition's defending champions were A.F.C. Leopards, who beat their Nairobi derby rivals Gor Mahia 1–0 in the previous final. Both teams were given byes to the third round, having reached the final the previous year.

Sofapaka, the winners of the competition, received KSh.2 million/= in prize money and represented Kenya in the preliminary round of the 2015 CAF Confederation Cup.

Teams

First round
The draw for the first round was held on 23 April.

The first round ties were played on the weekend of 26–27 April. 24 teams from FKF Division One, the Kenyan Provincial League, the County Champions League and the Sub-County League combined, as well as non-league teams, began their campaigns at this stage.

Vihiga United awarded walkover and advance to the second round.

Second round
The draw for the second round was held on 22 May 2014 at the Nyayo National Stadium, at 10:30 local time (UTC+3).

3 of the 12 winners from the first round were seeded and given byes to the third round, while 7 of the 38 Premier League and National Super League teams joining in the second round were also seeded and given byes to the third round. The second round ties were played between 30 May and 2 June.

On 23 May, Premier League side Sony Sugar announced that they were pulling out of the tournament due to unresolved issues within the club. Their opponents in the second round, Top Fry AllStars gained automatic qualification to the third round as a result. Former Premier League side Karuturi Sports followed suit 8 days later, also citing unresolved issues, giving their opponents West Kenya Sugar automatic qualification to the third round. Another Premier League side, Thika United, withdrew from the competition on 19 June.

Thika United withdrew from the tournament. Chemelil Sugar advance to the third round.

Karuturi Sports withdrew from the tournament. West Kenya Sugar advance to the third round.

Sony Sugar withdrew from the tournament. Top Fry AllStars advance to the third round.

Bracket

Third round
The draw for the third round was also held on 22 May 2014 at the Nyayo National Stadium, at 10:30 local time (UTC+3). Along with the 20 winners from the second round and 2013 finalists A.F.C. Leopards and Gor Mahia, 10 seeded teams will begin their campaigns at this stage. The third round ties are to be played from 18–20 July and 23 August.

Intercity, one of the seeded teams, was the only remaining Provincial League team in the tournament. Two more of the seeded teams, Ulinzi Warriors and Wazito, along with Mumbi Nationale and Nyakach United, were the only remaining FKF Division One teams competing for the title.

National Super League side Finlays Horticulture became the fourth team to give a walkover in the tournament, but the first to do so after failing to turn up for their match. Explaining why they could not face Bandari in their third round clash, head coach Sammy Okoth said that the team had lost eight players during the mid-season (June–July) transfer window, and as such the squad was depleted and not yet ready to take on such an intense match.

Finlays Horticulture failed to show up for the match. Bandari advance to the fourth round.

Fourth round
The fourth round ties were played from 30 August to 7 September.

Intercity remained the only Provincial League side competing for the title, while of the four FKF Division One teams remaining in the third round, only Wazito advanced to the fourth round. Seven of the initial 24 National Super League entrants and seven of the initial 16 Premier League teams also competed in the fourth round.

Quarter-finals
The quarter-final ties were played on the weekend of 27–28 September. Four teams from both the Premier League and the National Super League competed in this stage of the competition.

Semi-finals
The semi-final matches were played on 20 October. Two teams from both the Premier League and the National Super League competed at this stage of the competition.

A.F.C. Leopards vs Sofapaka abandonment
The match between A.F.C. Leopards and Sofapaka was abandoned in the 87th minute, moments after the latter's second goal through Ekaliana Ndolo, after fans stormed the pitch in protest of the officiating. Security personnel present at the Nairobi City Stadium where the match was taking place were forced to launch tear gas canisters onto the angry mob, while one linesman left with his head badly injured. An ambulance and a SuperSport van were also damaged after being stoned by the fans.

Before the match's abandonment, other incidents of crowd trouble arose from the Ingwe fans. Spectators began throwing bottles and stones deep into the first half, after Austin Ikenna was flagged offside just four minutes before Enock Agwanda's opening goal in the 26th minute, forcing a stoppage of about three minutes to restore calm in the stadium.

The following day, the Football Kenya Federation fined A.F.C. Leopards a sum of Ksh.500,000/= (approx. US$5,590 or £3,500 stg.), ordered the club to pay the medical expenses for the injured fans and match officials, as well as play its remaining matches for the season behind closed doors. West Kenya Sugar, the loser of the other semi-final of the day, were also handed an automatic third-place playoff win as part of the sanctions.

Match results

Final
The final was played on 15 November at the Afraha Stadium in Nakuru.

Posta Rangers became the first second-tier side to play in a Kenyan domestic cup final since their semi-final opponents West Kenya Sugar in 2010, when they also met (and lost to) Sofapaka in the final.

See also
 2014 Kenyan Premier League

Notes

 a. Of the 12 winners from the first round, Intercity, Ulinzi Warriors and Wazito were seeded and given byes to the third round.
 b. Of the 24 National Super League joining in the second round, Administration Police, Finlays Horticulture, Nairobi Stima, Shabana and Zoo Kericho were seeded and given byes to the third round, while Ulinzi Stars and Muhoroni Youth were seeded from the 14 Kenyan Premier League teams joining in the second round.

References

FKF President's Cup seasons
cup
2014 domestic association football cups